The 1937 Little All-America college football team is composed of college football players from small colleges and universities who were selected by the Associated Press (AP) as the best players at each position. For 1937, the AP did not select a second team but instead chose multiple players for "honorable mention" at each position. The AP also tightened its Little All-America classification, limiting the selections to players at schools with enrollment of not more than 1,000 boys and a football schedule "largely confined to colleges of the same class."

Selections
QB - Burns McKinney, Hardin-Simmons
HB - Dick Riffle, Albright
HB - Wendell Butcher, Gustavus Adolphus
FB - Clay Calhoun, Loyola (New Orleans)
E - Harry Kline, Emporia
E - William Smith, Marshall
T - Wayne Goddard, Cape Girardeau
T - Walter Riddle, Birmingham-Southern
G - Elmer Cochran, Murray State
G - Doug Oldershaw, Santa Barbara State
C - Wallace Johnson, Austin

See also
 1937 College Football All-America Team

References

Little All-America college football team
Little All-America college football teams